María Rodríguez Garrido, known as Mala Rodríguez, is a Spanish Latin hip hop artist based in Barcelona. She appeared as a judge on Spain's La Voz prior to releasing her first album in seven years, Mala, in May 2020. Rodríguez released her memoir, Cómo ser Mala, in June 2021. Rodríguez is also the first female artist to win both Best Urban Album and Best Urban Song at the Latin Grammy Awards, as well as the first urban artist to win Spain's National Music Award.

Early life
Maria Rodríguez was born in Jerez de la Frontera, Cádiz on February 13, 1979. She grew up in Seville and became involved with the city's thriving hip-hop scene as a teenager. The daughter of a hairdresser in an Andalusian family, she describes herself as being from a working-class family, saying, "My mother and I are both young, and all I know is that my family experienced hunger back then, and that sticks with you. I didn't grow up with luxury, but I never missed a meal either." At age seventeen, she performed onstage for the first time, and adopted the stage name La Mala.

Musical career
She rose to prominence in the late 1990s alongside fellow Sevillian hip hop acts such as La Gota Que Colma, SFDK, and La Alta Escuela. After she adopted the stage name La Mala, she appeared on La Gota Que Colma's album Mordiendo el Micro on the songs "No Hay Rebaja", and "Dando Guerra". She also appeared on SFDK's Siempre Fuertes and La Alta Escuela's En Pie de Vuelo on the song "Espectáculo en la Gancha". She made her solo debut with A Jierro/Toma la Traca, a maxi-single released by Zona Bruta in 1999. The song was originally planned for release by Zeroporsiento, a Sevillian label for which she had recorded the tracks. In 2000, she signed to Universal Music Spain, and released her full-length debut album, Lujo Ibérico. 

In 2001 Her song "Tengo lo que tu quieres" was part of the BSO of the Spanish movie Sex and Lucia.

Her second album, Alevosía, featured the single, "La Niña". The song gained notability when its controversial music video was banned from Spanish TV because of its depiction of a young female drug dealer.

On the soundtrack of the film Fast & Furious her single "Volveré", from the Malamarismo album, was featured.

In 2008, Rodriguez was invited to join Julieta Venegas for her MTV Unplugged performance singing the song "Eres para mí".

She performed with Maroon 5, Björk and LMFAO at the Festival Imperial in the Autódromo La Guácima racetrack in Alajuela, Costa Rica in March 2012.

In April 2013 she revealed on her Facebook page that her album, Bruja, would be released on June 18. On September 12, 2013, she went back to Costa Rica.

In 2015, Mala Rodriguez was one of the many artists featured on President Barack Obama’s Summer Spotify playlist.

NPR named one of her earlier singles "Yo Marco El Minuto" as one of the 200 Greatest Songs by 21st Century Women.

After a four-year hiatus, Mala released the single "Gitanas" on July 6, 2018. Pitchfork called her vocals "bold and unflinching, when she boldly asks 'Quién me protege?' ("Who protects me?") you can almost feel the ground quake beneath her feet. Mala already knows the answer to her question. Without missing a beat, she cries out, "Yo!" ("Me!"), daring anyone to doubt her." In 2019 Rodriguez became the first urban artist to win Spain's National Music Award and was a judge on Spain's La Voz (The Voice) leading up to her first album in seven years, Mala, released in May 2020. Rodriguez released her memoir Cómo ser Mala in June 2021.

Discography

Albums

EPs

Singles

Featured in

Collaborations

 La Gota que Colma "Mordiendo el micro" (1998)
 SFDK "Siempre fuertes" (1999)
 El Imperio "Monopolio" (1999)
 La Alta Escuela "Espectaculo en la cancha" (1999)
 Jota Mayúscula "Hombre negro soltero busca..." (2000)
 Ygryega "XXL" (2000)
 Poison "El Poeta de Mi Barrio" (2001)
 Dnoe "Que Piensan Las Mujeres 1: Personal" (2002)
 La Super K "Agüita" (2002)
 VV.AA. "Laboratorio Hip Hop CD1" (2003)
 VV.AA. "Flow Latino (Habana – Madrid)" (2003)
 Jota Mayúscula "Una vida Xtra" (2004)
 R de Rumba "Fabricante" (2004)
 Full Nelson "Confía en mí" (2005)
 VV.AA. "Bien Sobre Mal Vol.3" (2005)
 Akon "Locked Up (reedición)" (2005)
 Vico C "Vamonos Po' Encima" (2005)
 Upsurt "Втората цедка" (2006)
 Kultama "Nacional e importación" (2006)
 Antonio Carmona "Vengo venenoso" (2006)
 Griffi "Los Impresentables" (2006)
 Calle 13 "Mala suerte con el 13" (2007)
 Bajofondo "El Anden" (2007)
 Julieta Venegas "Tiempo Pa`Pensa" Malamarismo (2007)
 Vicentico y Kumbia All Starz "Vuelve" (2008)
 Jota Mayúscula  "Juega con el monstruo"
 Jota Mayúscula "Como un títere"
 Mentenguerra "Por La Noche"
 Nelly Furtado and Julieta Venegas "Bajo Otra Luz" (2009)
 Diego Torres "Mirar Atrás" (2010)
 Sebastian Yepes "De Lo Oscuro a Lo Puro" (2011)
 Romeo Santos "Magia Negra" (2011)
 Kinky "Negro Día" (2011)
 SOJA "Like It Used To"  (2014)
 El Guincho "Comix"  (2016)
 Ibeyi "Me Voy"  (2017)
 Beatriz Luengo "Caprichosa"  (2018)
 Juan Magán "Usted "  (2018)
 Stylo G "Contigo "  (2018)
 Dellafuente "Tenamoras " (2019)
 Denise Rosethal "Agua Segura " (2019)

Notes

External links

 
BrownPride.com 
RockEnEspanol.com 
DiarioLasAmericas.com Article in Spanish posted July 13, 2007, in Miami's Diario Las Americas daily newspaper 
Mala Rodriguez Concludes Her Appearance at the LAMC with Great Success Mala Rodriguez article posted in Chicago's Extra News, July 13, 2007 

1979 births
Living people
People from Jerez de la Frontera
Hip hop singers
Feminist musicians
Spanish women rappers
Spanish women singers
Latin Grammy Award winners
Singers from Andalusia
Spanish songwriters
Latin music songwriters
Women in Latin music
Women in hip hop music
Universal Music Latin Entertainment artists